The 1942 Utah State Aggies football team was an American football team that represented Utah State Agricultural College in the Mountain States Conference (MSC) during the 1942 college football season. In their 24th season under head coach Dick Romney, the Aggies compiled a 6–3–1 record (2–3–1 against MSC opponents), finished in fourth place in the MSC, and outscored opponents by a total of 201 to 137.

Schedule

References

Utah State
Utah State Aggies football seasons
Utah State Aggies football